Batapola is a village located in the Galle District of Sri Lanka.
Batapola is 8 km away from the town of Ambalangoda. Batayan ("Soldiers") lived there, which is where the name derives from.

References 

Populated places in Southern Province, Sri Lanka